Makok may refer to:

Makok, the Thai common name for the plant species Spondias pinnata
Makok nam, the Thai common name for the plant species Elaeocarpus hygrophilus
Makok Subdistrict, a tambon in Lamphun Province, Thailand